The Sky Gardens is a 45-floor tower in the Dubai International Financial Centre in Dubai, United Arab Emirates. The tower has a total structural height of 160 m (525 ft), 575 units vary from studio,1,2,3 bedroom and 7 luxury penthouses.  Sky Gardens was delivered by Caddick Developments, with construction completed in 2008. Construction started in March 2005.

See also 
 List of tallest buildings in Dubai

References

External links

Emporis

Residential buildings completed in 2008
Residential skyscrapers in Dubai